The Roman Catholic Archdiocese of Gulu is the Metropolitan See for the Ecclesiastical province of Gulu in Uganda.

History
 1923.06.12: Established as Apostolic Prefecture of Nilo Equatoriale from the Apostolic Vicariate of Bahr el-Ghazal in Sudan 
 1934.12.10: Promoted as Apostolic Vicariate of Nilo Equatoriale
 1950.12.01: Renamed as Apostolic Vicariate of Gulu
 1953.03.25: Promoted as Diocese of Gulu
 1999.01.02: Promoted as Metropolitan Archdiocese of Gulu

Special churches
The seat of the archbishop is the St. Joseph’s Cathedral in Gulu.

Bishops

Ordinaries
 Prefect Apostolic of Nilo Equatoriale (Roman rite) 
 Fr. Antonio Vignato, M.C.C.I. (1923.07.16 – 1933)
 Vicar Apostolic of Nilo Equatoriale (Roman rite) 
 Bishop Angelo Negri, M.C.C.I. (1934.12.10 – 1949.11.13)
 Vicar Apostolic of Gulu (Roman rite) 
 Bishop Giovanni Battista Cesana, M.C.C.I. (1950.12.01 – 1953.03.25 see below)
 Bishops of Gulu (Roman rite) 
 Bishop Giovanni Battista Cesana, M.C.C.I. (see above 1953.03.25 – 1968.12.19)
 Bishop Cipriano Biyehima Kihangire (1968.12.19 – 1990)
 Bishops of Gulu (Roman rite) 
 Bishop Martin Luluga (1990.02.08 – 1999.01.02), appointed Bishop of Nebbi
 Metropolitan Archbishops of Gulu (Roman rite)
 Archbishop John Baptist Odama (since 1999.01.02)

Auxiliary Bishops
Cipriano Biyehima Kihangire (1962-1965), appointed Bishop of Hoima; later returned here as Bishop
Martin Luluga (1986-1990), appointed Bishop here
Sabino Ocan Odoki (2006-2010), appointed Bishop of Arua

Suffragan Dioceses
 Arua
 Lira
 Nebbi

See also
Roman Catholicism in Uganda
List of Roman Catholic dioceses in Uganda
Gulu
Kalongo Hospital

References

Sources
 Catholic Hierarchy

External links
 GCatholic.org: Archdiocese of Gulu
 Catholic Hierarchy.org: Archdiocese of Gulu

Gulu
Roman Catholic Archdiocese of Gulu
Roman Catholic Archdiocese of Gulu
Christian organizations established in 1923
Roman Catholic dioceses and prelatures established in the 20th century